Dyrehaven means "the deer park" in Danish. It may refer to:
Jægersborg Dyrehave, north of Copenhagen, Denmark.
Aarhus Dyrehave, Aarhus, Denmark.